Kandahār (Kandahār, ;  Qandahār) is one of the thirty-four provinces of Afghanistan, located in the southern part of the country, sharing a border with Pakistan, to the south. It is surrounded by Helmand in the west, Uruzgan in the north and Zabul Province in the east. Its capital is the city of Kandahar, Afghanistan's second largest city, which is located on the Arghandab River. The greater region surrounding the province is called Loy Kandahar. The Emir of Afghanistan sends orders to Kabul from Kandahar making it the de facto capital of Afghanistan, although the main government body operates in Kabul. All meetings with the Emir take place in Kandahar, meetings excluding the Emir are in Kabul. 

The province contains about 18 districts, over 1,000 villages, and approximately 1,431,876 people (the 6th most populous province), which is mostly tribal and a rural society. The main inhabitants of Kandahar province are the ethnic Pashtuns. They are followed by the Baloch people, Tajiks, Uzbeks, Turkmens and Hazaras.

Etymology 
There is speculation revolving around the origin of the name "Kandahar". It is believed to have started as one of many cities named after the Hellenistic conqueror Alexander the Great throughout his vast (mainly ex-Achaemenid) empire, its present form deriving from the Pashto rendering of Arabic Iskandariya = Ancient Alexandria (in Arachosia).

A temple to the deified Alexander as well as an inscription in Greek and Aramaic by the emperor Ashoka, who lived a few decades later, have been discovered in the old citadel.

History

Excavations of prehistoric sites by archaeologists such as Louis Dupree and others suggest that the region around Kandahar is one of the oldest human settlements known so far.

The area was called Arachosia and was a frequent target for conquest because of its strategic location in Asia, which connects Southern, Central and Southwest Asia. It was part of the Medes territory before falling to the Achaemenids. In 330 BC it was invaded by Alexander the Great and became part of the Seleucid Empire following his death. Later it came under the influence of the Indian emperor Ashoka, who erected a pillar there with a bilingual inscription in Greek and Aramaic. The territory was ruled by the Zunbils before Arabs of the Umayyad Caliphate arrived in the 7th century. 

Mahmud of Ghazni made the area part of the Ghaznavids in the 10th century, who were replaced by the Ghurids. After the destructions caused by Genghis Khan in the 13th century, the Timurids established rule and began rebuilding cities. From about 1383 until his death in 1407, Kandahar was governed by Pir Muhammad, a grandson of Timur. By the early 16th century, it fell to Babur briefly. From then on the province was controlled as their easternmost territories by the Shia Safavids, who regularly had wars with the Sunni Mughals -who ruled Qandahar as a short-lived subah (imperial province), bordering Kabul and Multan subahs, from the 1638 conquest till its loss in 1648 to the great Safavid rival- over the region, until the rise of Mir Wais Hotak in 1709. He rebelled against the Safavids and established the Hotaki dynasty which became a powerful Afghan empire until 1729 when Nader Shah declared war on the Ghilzai rulers. By 1738 the last Hotaki ruler Shah Hussain was defeated in what is now Old Kandahar.

Ahmad Shah Durrani, the founding father of Afghanistan, gained control of the province in 1747 and made the city of Kandahar the capital of his new Afghan Empire. In the 1770s, the capital of the empire was transferred to Kabul. Ahmad Shah Durrani's mausoleum is located in the center of the city.

British-led Indian forces occupied the province during the First Anglo-Afghan War from 1832 to 1842. They also occupied the city during the Second Anglo-Afghan War from 1878 to 1880. It remained peaceful for about 100 years until the late 1970s.

During the Soviet occupation of 1979 to 1989, Kandahar province witnessed many fights between Soviet and local Mujahideen rebels. After the Soviet withdrawal the city fell to Gul Agha Sherzai, who became a powerful warlord and controlled the province.

At the end of 1994, the Taliban took over the area and set out to conquer the rest of Afghanistan. Since the removal of the Taliban government in late 2001, Kandahar again came under the control of Gul Agha Sherzai. He was replaced in 2003 by Yousef Pashtun followed by Asadullah Khalid and others. In the meantime, the United States established bases in the province. The various soldiers of International Security Assistance Force (ISAF) were also housed in the bases. The main base was at Kandahar International Airport. Their main objective is to train the Afghan National Security Forces (ANSF) as well as build government institutions and assist the local population.

In spring 2010, the province as well as its capital city became a target of American operations following Operation Moshtarak in neighboring Helmand province. Kandahar has been the site of much of the violence in the War on Terror in Afghanistan. That year Kandahar was known as "the most dangerous, most unmerciful area of the country."

Politics and governance

Yousaf Wafa is the current governor of the province. His predecessor was Rohullah Khanzada. Gul Agha Sherzai was governor of the province before and after the Taliban five-year government. In early 2003, then-President Hamid Karzai transferred Sherzai from Kandahar to Jalalabad as Governor of Nangarhar Province. Sherzai was replaced by Yousef Pashtun in Kandahar.

In 2005, when Karzai won the first Afghan Presidential Elections, he appointed Yousef Pashtun as the Minister of Urban Development. After Pashtun, Asadullah Khalid governed the province until the appointment of Rahmatullah Raufi in August 2008. Raufi was replaced by Toryalai Wesa in December 2008.

Demographics

According to the National Statistics and Information Authority (NSIA), the total population of the province was estimated at 1,431,876. Pashtuns make up the majority in province. There are also communities of Baloch people, Tajiks, Uzbeks, Turkmens, Hazaras and others. The main language spoken throughout the province is Pashto. Dari and Balochi is also understood by some, especially in the city of Kandahar where learning of Dari as a second language is promoted in public schools.

Tribes
The main tribes in the province are as follows:
Durrani
Barech
Popalzai
Alikozai
Barakzai
Achakzai
Momand
Mohammadzai
Ghilzai
Kakar
Babai
Tokhi
Norzai
Hotak
Taraki
Loudin
Brahui
Quraish
Sayed
Zurmati
Yousafzai

District information
In 1914 Kandahar was divided into the following districts:

 Kariajat (includes the suburbs of Kandahar and the Arghandab Valley)
 Mahalajat (Old Kandahar and surroundings)
 Daman
 Tirin
 Derawat
 Dahla
 Deh-i Buchi
 Khakrez
 Kushk-i Nakhud
 Maiwand
 Nish
 Ghorak
 Kalat-i Ghilzai
 Arghastan
 Tarnak
 Mizan
 Maruf
 Kadanai (named after the Kadanai river that flows through it)
 Shorawak

Today the province is divided into the following administrative divisions:

Transport and economy

The Ahmad Shah Baba International Airport is located east of the city of Kandahar. It is for civilian and military use. It serves the population of southern Afghanistan by providing domestic flights to other cities and international flights to Dubai, Pakistan, Iran and other regional countries. The airport was built by the United States in the 1960s under the United States Agency for International Development program. It was later used by Soviet and Afghan forces during the 1980s and again during the 2001–2021 NATO-led war. The airport was upgraded and expanded during the last decade by the United States Army Corps of Engineers.

There is currently no rail service but reports indicate that at least one will be built between the city of Kandahar and the border town of Spin Boldak in the south, which will then connect with Pakistan Railways. Ground transport of goods is done by trucks and cars. A number of important roads run through the province and this helps the area's economy. The town of Spin Boldak serves as a major transporting, shipping, and receiving site. It is being developed so that trade with neighboring Pakistan increases.

Kandahar province has bus services to major towns and village headquarters. Its capital, Kandahar, used to have a city bus service that took commuters on daily routes to different destinations throughout the city. There are taxicabs that provide transportation service inside the city as well as throughout the province. Other traditional methods of ground transportation are also used. Private vehicles are on the rise in the country, with large showrooms selling new or second-hand vehicles imported from the United Arab Emirates. More people are buying new cars as the roads and highways are being improved.

Kandahar has been known for having well-irrigated gardens and orchards, and was famous for its grapes, melons, and pomegranates. The main source of trade is to Pakistan, Iran and other regional countries. Kandahar is an agricultural area and several of the districts are irrigated by the Helmand and Arghandab Valley Authority. The Dahla Dam is located in the province, north of the city of Kandahar. There are approximately 700 greenhouses in the entire province but farmers want the government to build more.

Healthcare

There are a number of hospitals in the province, most of them in the city of Kandahar. They include Aino Mina Hospital, Al Farhad Hospital, Ayoubi Hospital, Mirwais Hospital, Mohmand Hospital, Sial Curative Hospital and Sidal Hospital.

Education

Kandahar University is one of the largest educational institutions in the province. It has over 5,000 students, about 300 of which are female students. In partnership with the Asia Foundation, Kandahar University conducted a pilot project that provided female high school graduates with a four-month refresher course to prepare for the college entrance examination. The university is one of two universities in Kandahar that serve all of southern Afghanistan. The conditions in the university are poor but improving slowly. Kandahar University is far behind many of the other universities in the country because of insecurity and shortage of funding,

There are approximately 377 public and private schools in Kandahar province. The total number of students is 362,000. Of this, 79,000 are female students. Due to insecurity and other issues, many female students drop out before obtaining a diploma. Almost 150 educational institutes were closed in the past, according to the education ministry. Some of the well known public schools in Kandahar are Ahmad Shah Baba High School, Mahmud Tarzi High School, Mirwais Hotak High School, Nazo Ana High School, Shah Mahmud Hotak High School, and Zarghuna Ana High School. Private schools include Afghan Turk High Schools.

Notable people from Kandahar Province 
 Royalty and statesmen 
 Abdul Aziz Hotak – Second ruler of the Hotaki dynasty
 Abdur Rahman Khan – King of Afghanistan
 Ahmad Shah Durrani – Founding father of Afghanistan (Father of the Nation)
 Ashraf Hotaki – Hotak Emir of Afghanistan and shortly Shah of Persia (1725–1729)
 Dost Mohammad Khan – Founder of the Barakzai dynasty/Emirate of Afghanistan
 Hamid Karzai – President of Afghanistan
 Hussain Hotaki – Last ruler of the Hotaki dynasty
 Mahmud Hotaki – Third ruler of the Hotaki dynasty and Shah of Persia
 Mir Wais Hotak – Founder of Hotaki dynasty
 (Mohammad) Ayub Khan – Afghan Emir, defeated the British in Second Anglo-Afghan War
 Mohammad Hashim Maiwandwal – Prime Minister of Afghanistan
 Nur Jahan – Empress of the Mughal Empire
 Sher Ali Khan – Emir of Afghanistan
 Timur Shah Durrani – Second ruler of the Durrani Empire
 Zaman Shah Durrani – Third ruler of the Durrani Empire

 Other politics, generals and administration
 Ghulam Haider Hamidi – Mayor of Kandahar who was killed in July 2011
 Abdul Ahad Karzai – Former tribal leader of Popalzai tribe, former Deputy Speaker of Afghan Parliament
 Yahya Maroofi – Secretary General of ECO
 Mohammad Arif Noorzai – tribal leader, former Deputy Speaker of Afghan Parliament
 Yousef Pashtun – Senior Advisor to the Afghan President, Former Minister of Urban Development, Former Governor of Kandahar Province
 Mohammad Omar Shairzaad - former member of the House of Elders
 Gul Agha Sherzai – Governor of Nangarhar Province
 Toryalai Wesa – Former Governor of Kandahar Province
 Muhammad Yousuf Wafa - Current Governor of Kandahar Province

 Culture
 Abdul Bari Jahani – Poet, writer, author of the Afghan National Anthem
 Abdul Hai Habibi- Poet, Writer, Historian, Founder and Developer of Academic Pashto era.
 Faizullah Kakar - Afghan epidemiologist. Previous Chief of Staff to President Ashraf Ghani, the Afghan Ambassador to Qatar, the Adviser to President for Health and Education, and the Deputy Minister of Public Health for the Islamic Republic of Afghanistan.

See also 
Kandahar
Khosrow Sofla
Lower Babur
Registan Desert
Tarok Kolache

References

Further reading
 Vogelsang, W. (1985). Early historical Arachosia in South-east Afghanistan; Meeting-place between East and West.
 Dupree, Louis. (1973) Afghanistan. Princeton: Princeton University Press.
 Rashid, Ahmed. (2000) Taliban: Militant Islam, Oil, and Fundamentalism in Central Asia. New Haven, CT: Yale University Press.

External links 

 Kandahar Provincial Overview by Naval Postgraduate School
 The Taliban's Campaign for Kandahar by Institute for the Study of War

 
Provinces of Afghanistan
Provinces of the Islamic Republic of Afghanistan